Lentinula is a small genus of wood-inhabiting agarics. The neotropical species Lentinula boryana (= L. cubensis) is the type species. However, the best-known species is L. edodes, the shiitake. The genus, erected by Franklin Sumner Earle in 1909, contains eight species, principally found in tropical regions.

Species

See also
List of Marasmiaceae genera
 Shiitake

References

Further reading

External links

Marasmiaceae
Agaricales genera